Saint Anselm or Anselm of Canterbury was archbishop of Canterbury in the 11th and 12th centuries.

Saint Anselm may also refer to:
 Saint Anselm of Lucca the Younger (1036–1086), bishop of Lucca, Italy
 Saint Anselm, Duke of Friuli (died 805)
 Saint Anselm Abbey (New Hampshire), a Benedictine abbey of monks in Goffstown, New Hampshire, United States
 Saint Anselm College, its associated college
 Sant'Anselmo all'Aventino, the primatial abbey of the Benedictines in Rome, Italy, that has four institutions:
 Pontifical Atheneum of St. Anselm, its associated pontifical university
 College of Sant'Anselmo, its ecclesiastical residential college
 Curia of the Benedictine Confederation located at Sant'Anselmo
 Church of Sant'Anselmo located on the grounds of Sant'Anselmo all'Aventino

See also 
 Anselm (disambiguation)
 Saint Anselm's (disambiguation)